The Confederation of Greek Civil Servants' Trade Unions (ADEDY), was established in May of 1926 under the name Civil Servants' Confederation. Banned under the Metaxas regime, it began organizing covertly against the regime, as well as the subsequent Nazi Occupation during the Second World War. Officially reorganized after the Greek Civil War, ADEDY is a federation of public sector trade unions in Greece affiliated with the European Trade Union Confederation. ADEDY's private sector sister union is the General Confederation of Greek Workers.

ADEDY is non-partisan, and as such, not affiliated with any political party. Its leadership council is made up of figures from the conservative New Democracy, socialist SYRIZA, social democratic PASOK, the Communist Party of Greece, as well as the anti-capitalist ANT.AR.SY.A. The Communist Party of Greece's official union, the All-Workers Militant Front, has criticized ADEDY regarding the presence of New Democracy and other right-wing and centrist groups in their leadership.

See also

Trade unions in Greece

References

External links
 Official site

Trade unions in Greece
International Trade Union Confederation
1926 establishments in Greece